Hear Me Now is Secondhand Serenade's third studio album, released on August 3, 2010. The album debuted at #42 on the Billboard 200, 2 slots prior to his 2008 release "A Twist in My Story",  making his highest chart debut on Billboard 200.

Background
The singer-songwriter calls the album a slight departure from his previous releases, both in content and sound. "This album, for once, talks about how I'm feeling and how I'm kind of coping and moving on, and good things that are going on with me, bad things, things happening with work -- it's not just limited to relationships. A lot of it is more like kind of re-examining who I am and if I'm happy with myself". In an interview, John Vesely stated that the new record will be more upbeat than his last album, which focused on relationships.

The progression reflects his life as both a musician and family man. "I grew up really, really quickly," he says. "I had my first child when I was 20 years old. That's all a part of becoming mature. I had to mature quickly, and very early on ... I have these little kids that rely on me to take care of them. And there's no bigger drive you can possibly have than actual people relying on you." -John Vesely

"The label was telling me that we needed more songs for the album, that we weren't quite done, and I was worried my album was never going to come out," he recalls. "I just sat at the piano and started writing the song; it was a lot different than any of the other songs I'd written, and it...became the first single." Vesely says he "really enjoyed" taking the reins for a few songs. "It was something I've always wanted to do and finally had the confidence to go out and do it," he says. "Some of my favorite songs are the ones I produced myself. It was a really great experience for me." --John Vesely

Track listing
All songs written by John Vesely, and eight of the eleven songs on the album were produced by Aaron Johnson (The Fray) at Swing House studios in Los Angeles, the other three, "You & I", "Hear Me Now" and the first single, "Something More", were produced by John Vesely himself along with Secondhand drummer Tom Breyfogle at Vesely's home studio and mixed by Mark Endert (Train, Maroon 5).  The second single is said to be You & I ft: Cady Groves and the 3rd single has been hinted as the title track Ft: Juliet Simms

Critical reception

The album has received generally unfavorable reviews from critics.

"Sound In The Signals" magazine gave the album a mixed review "Overall, I would say it is a decent pop album. Vesely definitely isn't breaking any new ground and isn't the most original songwriter. The lyrics at times feel weak and in certain spots are a little too repetitive (see “World Turns), but lyrically it has shiny spots. I don't want to be too hard on the album. I always look forward to Secondhand Serenade albums in the same way I always looked forward to An Angle albums. I'm always waiting for the moment when the influences the artists draw from shed away and the artists start to shine as themselves.

Andrew Leahey from Allmusic gave the album 2 stars: "Hear Me Now still clings to Dashbooard Confessional's downtrodden template, with all 11 tracks subscribing to the notion that a song isn’t worth singing unless it involves heartbreak and defeatist lyrics." "Hear Me Now isn't offensive; it's just predictable and anonymous, since none of these songs offer up anything that Secondhand Serenade’s Warped Tour comrades haven't already done with their own albums." 

also gave the album 2 stars: "“Hear Me Now” is characterized by mediocre emo-pop ballads and a heaping of the most stereotypical, tear-your-heart-out-in-the-middle-school-bathroom sound imaginable, but there are surprising moments that manage to transcend the tackiness." 

J. Edward Keyes from Rolling Stone followed the trend in giving the album a 2 star rating: "The tone of penitence and isolation continue throughout the entirety of "Hear Me Now", with Vesely contemplating loneliness both romantic ("Only Hope") and existential ("Is There Anybody Out There?"). 

Sputnik Music gave the album 2 stars (out of 10), "There are too many dull and forgettable moments, too many attempts at emotional grandeur, and too few sincere attempts at “shaking things up.” Unfortunately for Secondhand Serenade, their sound is not good enough to repeat to this extent and outside of a select few moments, very little on Hear Me Now qualifies as new." 

Gregory Robson from Absolute Punk gave the album a 71/100 rating, "While it's not exactly an album of the year candidate, there's enough radio fodder and at least a few hints at the possibility of another platinum-selling single. While Veseley has gone on record as admitting that Hear Me Now would focus less on relationships and more on upbeat numbers, neither of those two things are true."

Album credits
Performance credits
John Vesely – Vocals; Producer; Bass; Guitar; Drums; Piano; Keyboards
Aaron Johnson – Producer; Guitar
Tom Breyfogle – Producer; Drums
Zac Rae – Keyboards
Juliet Simms – Vocals
Dan Rothchild – Bass
Lukas Vesely – Bass
David Levitta – Guitar
Dave Wilder – Bass

Technical credits
John Vesely – Drum Programming; String arrangement
Warren Huart – Engineering
Robin Holden – Engineering
Tom Breyfogle – Engineering; Drum programming
Jay Clifford – String arrangement
Tim Palmer – Mixing
Mark Endert – Mixing
Aaron Johnson – Mixing
Stephan Marcussen – Mastering
Davie Dunkeith – Assistant Engineer
Joey Florence – Assistant Engineer
Steve Shebby – Assistant Engineer
Wicz – Drum Programming
Ryan Cook – Assistant Engineer

Additional credits
Nathan Johnson & Marke Johnson – Physical album art direction; Layout; Design
Liran Okanon – Digital album booklet design

Release history

References

Secondhand Serenade albums
2010 albums